Jason Gonzalez may refer to:
 Jason Gonzalez (attorney)
 Jason Gonzalez (fighter)

See also
 Jasond González, Colombian footballer